Mas Isman (January 1, 1924 – December 12, 1982) was an Indonesian freedom fighter in East Java when it was part of the Dutch East Indies. He received a National Hero of Indonesia award from President Joko Widodo on November 5, 2015.

Mas Isman was the father of Hayono Isman, Indonesia's Minister of Youth and Sports Affairs.

References

1924 births
1982 deaths
People from Bondowoso Regency
National Heroes of Indonesia